Ryabinovka is a rural locality (a village) in Vakhromeyevskoye Rural Settlement, Kameshkovsky District, Vladimir Oblast, Russia. The population was 35 as of 2010.

Geography 
Ryabinovka is located 19 km north of Kameshkovo (the district's administrative centre) by road. Tyntsy is the nearest rural locality.

References 

Rural localities in Kameshkovsky District